The Zealots were a political movement in 1st-century Judaism.

Zealot or Zealots may also refer to:
 Zealot (Judaism), Jewish zealotry in the scriptures
 Simon the Zealot, one of the apostles of Jesus Christ
 Zealots of Piety, in 17th century Russia
 Zealots of Thessalonica, a radical party in the mid-14th century Byzantine Empire

Entertainment
 Zealot (Wildstorm), a member of the Wildcats fictional superhero team
Zealot: The Life and Times of Jesus of Nazareth, a book by Reza Aslan
Zealot: A Book About Cults, a book by Zo Thornely
The Zealot, an alternate title for the U.S. publication of Simon Scarrow's novel The Eagle in the Sand
 "Zealots", a song on Fugees' album The Score
Zealot, an album and EP by Muslimgauze; see Bryn Jones discography

See also
Zeal (disambiguation)
Zealotry in Jewish history